Harold "Howie" S. Weed (born December 23, 1962) is an American visual and special effects artist known for his work on Hollywood films and franchises. His most notable works have been Star Wars: Episode V The Empire Strikes Back, Star Trek, and Pirates of the Caribbean: The Curse of the Black Pearl.
Weed started his career in films in the 1980s with an uncredited model making job for the film Gremlins.

Star Wars
Weed has gained a cult following for his involvement with the Star Wars Universe. Weed works with George Lucas' company Industrial Light and Magic and has appeared in Episode IV as multiple characters and worked on multiple Star Wars films behind the scenes with his special effects work.

In the 1997 Special Edition re-release of Star Wars: A New Hope, Weed played Ketwol, a character created with a costume and mechanical stilts.

Also in the re-release, Weed appeared as the Wampa, replacing actor Des Webb, and then as character Melas.

Weed worked on Star Wars: Episode I The Phantom Menace as a digital model development and construction artist and then Star Wars: Episode III Revenge of the Sith as a digital modeler.

Weed has been interviewed for the Star Wars: Insider magazine and Jedi News.

In literature
Weed appears in: 
17th International Conference on Computer Graphics and Interactive Techniques 
Cinefex issues 69-72 Dracula in Visual Media: Film, Television, Comic Book and Electronic Game Appearances, 1921-2010 by John Edgar BrowningThe Encyclopedia of Fantastic Film: Ali Baba to Zombies by R.G. YoungStar Wars: The Making of Episode I, The Phantom Menace'' by Laurent Bouzereau and Jody Duncan

Filmography

Incomplete lists of Weed's visual effects works appear on the websites Hollywood.com and the New York Times.

References

1962 births
Special effects people
Living people